Jane is a 2022 American psychological thriller film directed by Sabrina Jaglom and written by Jaglom and Rishi Rajani. The film stars Madelaine Petsch, Chloe Bailey, and Melissa Leo.

The film was released in select theaters on August 26, 2022, by Blue Fox Entertainment and via streaming on September 16, 2022, on Creator+.

Plot
Ambitious high school senior Olivia Brooks struggles with grief from the recent loss of a friend. When she gets deferred from her dream college, she begins to spiral and experiences a series of increasingly frightening panic attacks. In an attempt to regain some sense of control, she embarks on a social media-fueled rampage against those who stand in the way of her success. But as things escalate, she is forced to confront and ultimately embrace her darkest impulses in order to get ahead.

Cast
 Madelaine Petsch as Olivia Brooks
 Chloe Bailey as Isabelle "Izzy" Morris
 Chloe Yu as Jane
 Nina Bloomgarden as Camille
 Ian Owens as Mr. Richardson
 Kerri Medders as Josa Jacobs
 Victoria Foyt as Mrs. West
 Melissa Leo as Principal Rhodes

Production
Jane was originally intended to be the first film made by Creator+, but another film Diamond in the Rough was chosen by the studio and released in June 2022.

Principal photography on the film began on August 2, 2021, in New Mexico. However, the production was suspended due to the COVID-19 pandemic. Filming later resumed and completed on August 23, 2021.

References

External links
 

2022 psychological thriller films
2020s American films
2020s English-language films
2020s high school films
American high school films
American psychological thriller films
Films about cyberbullying
Films about school bullying
Films about social media
Film productions suspended due to the COVID-19 pandemic
Films shot in New Mexico
Teen thriller films